Paavo Roininen (24 July 1935 – 10 October 2022) was a Finnish boxer. He competed in the men's bantamweight event at the 1960 Summer Olympics. At the 1960 Summer Olympics in Rome, he received a bye in the Round of 64. He then lost to Frankie Taylor of Great Britain by knockout in the Round of 32.

References

External links
 

1935 births
2022 deaths
People from Utajärvi
Finnish male boxers
Olympic boxers of Finland
Boxers at the 1960 Summer Olympics
Bantamweight boxers
Sportspeople from North Ostrobothnia